Mycterus is a genus of palm and flower beetles in the family Mycteridae. There are about seven described species in Mycterus.

Species
 Mycterus canescens Horn, 1879
 Mycterus concolor LeConte, 1853
 Mycterus curculioides (Fabricius, 1781)
 Mycterus elongata Hopping, 1935
 Mycterus marmoratus Pollock, 1993
 Mycterus quadricollis Horn, 1874
 Mycterus scaber Haldeman, 1843
 Mycterus umbellatarum  (Fabricius, 1787)

References

Further reading

 
 
 

Tenebrionoidea
Tenebrionoidea genera